The following is a list of former and current Australian sailboat racing associations. Current associations are affiliated with and recognised by Australian Sailing (AS) unless noted otherwise.

References

Sailing in Australia